The 2012 Sagan Tosu season was Sagan Tosu's first season in J.League Division 1 after being promoted for J.League Division 2 in 2011. They finished the season in fifth position, narrowly missing out on an AFC Champions League spot by two points. They also participated in the J.League Cup, going out in the Group Stages, and the Emperor's Cup, where they reached the Second Round before defeat to Kamatamare Sanuki. It was their second season with Yoon Jung-hwan as their manager, and Yohei Toyoda was their top goalscorer with 16 league goals.

Players

Transfers

In:

Out:

Competitions

J.League

Results summary

Results by round

Matches

League table

J.League Cup

Group A

Emperor's Cup

Squad statistics

Appearances and goals

|-
|colspan="14"|Players who appeared for Sagan Tosu no longer at the club:
|}

Top scorers

Disciplinary record

References

Sagan Tosu
Sagan Tosu seasons